Thomas Marsland (13 September 1777 – 18 November 1854) was a British Conservative and Tory politician.

Marsland was elected Tory Member of Parliament for Stockport at the 1832 general election and, becoming a Conservative in 1834, held the seat until 1841 when he was defeated. While he attempted to regain the seat at a by-election in 1847, he was unsuccessful.

References

External links
 

UK MPs 1832–1835
UK MPs 1835–1837
UK MPs 1837–1841
Conservative Party (UK) MPs for English constituencies
Tory MPs (pre-1834)
1777 births
1854 deaths